Jimmy Raye may refer to:

Jimmy Raye II, American football coach, former Offensive Coordinator of San Francisco 49ers
Jimmy Raye III, son of Jimmy Raye II, current director of player personnel with Indianapolis Colts